All That is an American sketch comedy television series created by Brian Robbins and Mike Tollin. The series originally aired on Nickelodeon from April 16, 1994, to October 22, 2005, lasting ten seasons, and was produced by Tollin/Robbins Productions and by Schneider's Bakery in season ten. The pilot episode was originally shown as a special "sneak peek" on April 16, 1994, with the show officially debuting as a regular series on December 24 the same year.

The series features original short comedic sketches and weekly musical guests aimed toward a young audience. Its sketches parody contemporary culture and are performed by a large and varying cast of child and teen actors. Early episodes were taped at Nickelodeon Studios at Universal Orlando Resort and then moved to Hollywood at the Nickelodeon on Sunset theatre, where other Nickelodeon shows such as The Amanda Show, Kenan & Kel, and Drake & Josh were taped.

All That went on to become a fixture on Nickelodeon for over a decade, and has received acclaim for its diverse cast and impact on children's television. The series has spun off several members of the cast in their own Nickelodeon television series with varying levels of success. It has been marketed in other ways, including an audio recording, books, a feature film, festival tour, and numerous reunions and specials celebrating the legacy of All That.

In 2019, Robbins, the current president of Nickelodeon and co-creator of the original series, announced a revival of the series with original cast member Kenan Thompson serving as executive producer, with Kel Mitchell later confirmed in the same role. The eleventh season premiered on June 15, 2019, with musical guests The Jonas Brothers. Original cast members Lori Beth Denberg and Josh Server each appeared, and would make sporadic appearances throughout the season. The last episode of the series aired on December 17, 2020, after production was suspended due to the COVID-19 pandemic.

History

Development
Brian Robbins and Michael Tollin created the show, and the head writer was Dan Schneider who also became the showrunner of the series in the third season. All That marked the beginning of Schneider's prolific career in creating and writing hit television series for young audiences. The New York Times, in separate articles, referred to Schneider as "the Norman Lear of children's television" and "the master of a television genre".

In 1986, Robbins and Schneider met while working on the ABC sitcom Head of the Class. Becoming close friends, the two performers both shared a mutual interest in writing, eventually coming together to write and then pitch an episode to the show's producers just to see if they could do it. To their amazement, the producers liked their idea and bought it. Their episode ("Will the Real Arvid Engen Please Stand Up") later aired during the show's second season.

Following the success of Head of the Class, Robbins and Schneider were asked to co-host the second annual Kids Choice Awards in 1988 alongside Tony Danza and Debbie Gibson. Although they were unaware of the fledgling Nickelodeon cable channel, the two agreed to participate. The award ceremony that year was produced by Albie Hecht, with whom Robbins and Schneider quickly struck up a friendship. Their friendship continued after the awards, and Hecht suggested they develop something for Nickelodeon. Robbins and Schneider declined his offer, as they were still under contract with ABC.

By 1991, Head of the Class ended its run and Robbins started a production company with producer friend Mike Tollin, aptly named Tollin/Robbins Productions. The company originally produced several small budget sport documentaries. Hecht, now Head of Development for Nickelodeon, contacted them and asked them to tape a project for the network. The half-hour documentary they made featured the network's game show hosts Phil Moore (Nick Arcade) and Mike O'Malley (Get the Picture and Nickelodeon GUTS) as co-hosts of a comedy tour as they drove around to different cities to perform. Since their schedule only permitted for two days of taping, Tollin/Robbins had to make the entire show appear as if they had toured around the country.

Impressed with the final product, Hecht later met with Robbins to discuss developing something; asking Robbins if there was any type of show that he would be interested in making. Robbins pitched an idea of creating a kid-friendly version of Saturday Night Live. He brought Tollin and Schneider (as head writer) along to help develop the show. The three were influenced by classic sketch shows such as The Carol Burnett Show, You Can't Do That on Television and Laugh In, and began to flesh out a rough idea of the show's format. Schneider decided against writing the pilot episode and instead chose to compile the cast first. Usually, in television, the pilot is written first and the cast is assembled later. However, the three believed it was crucial to find the right actors first and then tailor to their strengths. A nationwide talent search for child and teen actors was launched that would last for several months. Eventually, Angelique Bates, Lori Beth Denberg, Katrina Johnson, Kel Mitchell, Alisa Reyes, Josh Server, and Kenan Thompson were hired.

Original series (1994–2000)
With the cast intact, writing began. The basic concept for the series was a half-hour show that featured a cold open (which featured the cast participating in varying juvenile acts in a green room or around the studio before the show starts), several different sketches; including "runners" (short little sketches), and then a musical performance to close out the episode. The main staple was the Vital Information sketch which would go on to be featured in every show through the end of the sixth season (some people compared it to the SNL longest running sketch Weekend Update). Cast and crew flew out to Nickelodeon Studios at Universal Orlando to shoot the pilot in front of a studio audience on January 17, 1994. After taping was completed, the pilot was shelved as screenings did not test well with the focus groups, consisting of children, both boys and girls in different age groups, that Nickelodeon used. The scores showed that "Kids probably wouldn't like this new sketch comedy show for kids". Regardless of the negative response, Geraldine Laybourne (then President of Nickelodeon) decided to pick the series up.

During the first season, writing partners Kevin Kopelow and Heath Seifert were brought on as producers and continued working in that capacity through the third season. They continued their relationship with Thompson and Mitchell by co-executive producing and head writing the spin-off series Kenan & Kel and eventually writing the feature film Good Burger (1997) with Schneider.

After production on the second season wrapped in 1996, the show moved out of the old Nickelodeon Studios at Universal Orlando Resort in Florida. The network, interested in moving production of their live-action series to the West Coast began scouting sound stages in California. Production for the third season was completed at the Paramount Pictures studio before Nickelodeon obtained a lease for the 6230 Sunset Boulevard facility. During this period, Bates left the show and was replaced by Amanda Bynes. A Nickelodeon producer discovered Amanda while she attended a children's comedy camp at LA's Laugh Factory. At the end of the third season, Johnson and Reyes left the show.

In 1997, the Sunset Boulevard property was acquired and branded as Nickelodeon on Sunset (formerly The Earl Carrol Theater). Production for the series would remain here until the end of the tenth season in 2005. The fourth season began with the additions of Leon Frierson, Christy Knowings, and Danny Tamberelli to the cast. Knowings and Tamberelli were known to Nickelodeon producers having both participated in other projects for the network; Knowings was discovered while taping a pilot for a show called And Now This; Tamberelli was the star of The Adventures of Pete & Pete, and guest starred on the Nickelodeon game show Figure It Out where he befriended fellow guest star Kopelow. At the end of the fourth season, Denberg and Schneider left the show. Schneider initially left the series to create his own sitcom, and later took over a fledgling pilot for Bynes that would become The Amanda Show.

For the fifth season, Kopelow and Seifert took over Schneider's responsibilities as head writers and co-executive producers; Tamberelli succeeded Denberg as the new Vital Information anchor; added to the cast were Nick Cannon and Mark Saul. Although a teenager at the time, Cannon previously worked as the audience warm up and writer for the show before joining the cast.

On March 13, 1999, Nickelodeon celebrated the series in an hour long show dubbed All That Live in honor of the show's "100th episode” (although it was chronologically the 86th episode to be aired on the network). The episode was the first, and only occurrence in the show's history done entirely live in front of a studio audience.
The 100th episode featured several celebrities: Melissa Joan Hart (Sabrina the Teenage Witch and Nickelodeon's Clarissa Explains It All), Larisa Oleynik (Nickelodeon's The Secret World of Alex Mack), Robert Ri'chard (Nickelodeon's Cousin Skeeter), and Britney Spears (in a taped video appearance; Spears was originally supposed to perform in person but had to back out due to a knee injury and Lauryn Hill took her place) all made appearances; with Bates, Denberg, Johnson and Reyes appearing as well.

After the 100th episode, the show won the Kids' Choice Award for Favorite TV Show on May 1, 1999. The fifth season ended with the departures of Mitchell and Thompson. Stand-up comedian Gabriel Iglesias was hired to replace the two for the following season. The abbreviated sixth season was followed by a nationwide summer tour titled All That Music and More Festival hosted by the cast and featured musical guests. Kopelow, Seifert and the entire cast left the series soon after. In their absence, Schneider returned as showrunner.

Relaunch series (2002–2005)
In 2000, All That was put on hiatus to be relaunched with a new cast. During the hiatus, Nickelodeon ran a series of specials. Production for the seventh season started back up a year later after an extensive nationwide talent search for child and teen actors. Ultimately hired were Chelsea Brummet, Jack DeSena, Lisa Foiles, Bryan Hearne, Shane Lyons, Giovonnie Samuels, and Kyle Sullivan. The format of the series remained roughly the same as the original seasons, but episodes now featured a weekly host who would appear alongside the cast in sketches (the weekly host was gradually phased out of the show later on). Vital Information was also dropped, and replaced with a new segment called Know Your Stars which would appear regularly. The first episode of the "new" All That featured special guests Frankie Muniz and Aaron Carter and debuted on January 19, 2002.

The eighth season opened with the addition of Jamie Lynn Spears to the cast and marked the beginning of All That cast members attempting dares on the SNICK program Snick On-Air Dare. Occasionally, On Air Dares had special guests from other shows. Hearne left the series just as Nickelodeon advertised a competition called R U All That?: Nickelodeon's Search for the Funniest Kid in America. The grand prize of the competition was an opportunity to become a cast member. After this contest ended in 2003, the finals aired on July 26, 2003. The contest picked five finalists, and all of them performed a sketch with the current cast. The winner was Christina Kirkman who would officially join the cast in ninth season. The competition's runner-up Ryan Coleman would join the cast later that year. At the end of the ninth season, Lyons, Samuels, and Spears departed the series. Spears left to focus on a new Nickelodeon show created by Dan Schneider called Zoey 101.

In 2005, the tenth season began with a celebration of the show's tenth anniversary. Nickelodeon celebrated the anniversary of All That by airing episodes from the first six seasons in the week leading up to a "reunion special" on April 23, 2005, hosted by Muniz and featuring Ashanti and Bow Wow as the musical guests. The special featured the cast from the original series and relaunch performing in sketches together. And, after a hiatus, the Vital Information sketch was brought back with BET's Coming to the Stage winner Lil' JJ as the anchor. The special also introduced Kianna Underwood and Denzel Whitaker as new cast members. Approximately 6.2 million total viewers watched the special on both its April 23 and 24 airings, making it the top cable or broadcast program for the 2–11, 6–11, and 9–14 age demographics, and TV.com gave it a rating of 8.7/10.

Chronologically, the anniversary special and season were taped in the fall of 2004, then Nickelodeon came to air them the following year. After the anniversary, the new season began airing a week later. The tenth season would mark the end of the relaunch era of the show as Foiles announced the show's cancellation in September 2005 via social media. The entire cast and Schneider moved on from the series. Schneider would go on to have a successful career creating television programs for the Nickelodeon network.

Revival series (2019–2020)

In the fall of 2018, Brian Robbins, co-creator of the series, was formally announced as the new president of Nickelodeon. Now in charge of the company's programming unit, Robbins expressed interest in a revival of the show, saying, in an interview with the Hollywood Reporter, that:

The show's revival was announced as part of Nickelodeon's 2019 content slate on February 14, 2019. On May 14, 2019, it was announced that the show would premiere on June 15, 2019, with Kenan Thompson and Kel Mitchell serving as executive producers; Kevin Kopelow and Heath Seifert returning as consulting producers; and the involvement of former cast members in sketches. However, Dan Schneider, former executive producer of the series, would not be involved with the second relaunch as Nickelodeon had cut ties with Schneider in 2018.

By 2017, Nickelodeon had ceased all operations at the Nickelodeon on Sunset lot and the property was later sold. Production for the revival series was done at The Burbank Studios (formerly known as NBC Studios) in Burbank, California. The new cast was officially revealed on Today with Hoda & Jenna on May 29, 2019. The cast included Ryan Alessi, Reece Caddell, Kate Godfrey, Gabrielle Green, Nathan Janak, Lex Lumpkin, and Chinguun Sergelen. An expanded episode order, adding 13 episodes to the initial 13, was announced in October 2019, along with Aria Brooks being added to the cast starting with episode 14. An additional ten episodes were ordered in February 2020, with eight of them being completed before production was suspended due to the COVID-19 pandemic in March 2020. However, despite the postponement, production did not resume.

The format of the series remained roughly the same as the original era and the relaunch era. Minor changes to the format included the traditional cold open (which featured the cast in a green room or around the studio before the show started) occasionally appearing later in an episode rather than at the beginning; Vital Information, now sporadically appearing, was kept on with Caddell as anchor; and Know Your Stars was dropped for the revival.

The revival series featured the involvement of former cast members appearing regularly with the new cast in sketches. Numerous classic characters from the previous eras were revived as well. Besides Mitchell and Thompson; Lori Beth Denberg, Lisa Foiles, Alisa Reyes, Mark Saul, Josh Server, and Jamie Lynn Spears all returned to cameo.

In celebration of the show's return to Nickelodeon, a Good Burger pop-up location opened to fans in Santa Monica, California. With the purchase of a ticket, guests have access to a menu inspired by the sketch and film, a small arcade, and memorabilia and set pieces.

Cast

The sketches of All That are performed by a large and varying cast of child, teen, and young adult actors. The following is a list of the main cast and featured performer from the 2019 revival (a complete cast list can be found in the link above):

Musical guests
Each episode of All That features a musical guest that closes out the show. Later seasons featured a weekly host who would appear alongside the cast in sketches (the weekly host was gradually phased out of the show later on).

Episodes

Sketches
All That features original short comedic sketches that parody contemporary culture. Although the show had a team of writers, the cast was encouraged to help contribute their own ideas for characters and other segments. Improv and ad-libbing were used to help the cast and writers find the right tone for a certain skit. The following is a short list of some notable sketches that aired during the show's tenure.

Impact and legacy
All That is highly regarded for its large diverse cast both in terms of ethnicity and gender. The show was praised in The Atlantic for breaking the classical norms set in children's TV with its cast, irreverent and unapologetic humor, and kid characters played by actual kids.

When All That debuted in 1994, television was still primarily segregated by race as shown by popular sitcoms like Seinfeld (where the cast is completely white) or Martin (where the cast is entirely black); even Saturday Night Live was dominated by white male comedians. Robbins, Schneider and Tollin wanted the show to reflect its audience and also sought out varying musical acts (alternative, hip hop and R&B among others) to embrace the diversity

Awards and nominations

Reunion events
In 2011, Lisa Foiles joined forces with Comikaze Expo, planning the first ever All That reunion with Comikaze Expo CEO Regina Carpinelli. The reunion featured a roundtable discussion, where the cast reflected on their tenure on the show and received questions from the audience. Angelique Bates, Lori Beth Denberg, Foiles, Leon Frierson, Katrina Johnson, Kevin Kopelow, Kel Mitchell, Alisa Reyes, Giovonnie Samuels, Mark Saul, Josh Server all participated in the event.

Also in 2011, Bates, Johnson, and Reyes appeared together at Zooey Magazines One Year Anniversary Special Event held in Hollywood. The anniversary launched the Love Is Louder campaign which speaks out against bullying and hate messages.

In the 2011 special "iParty with Victorious" (a crossover between iCarly and Victorious), when Carly Shay (portrayed by Miranda Cosgrove) asks Kenan Thompson for a favor, he jokingly complains that everyone wants to borrow money from him, including Andy Samberg (Thompson's Saturday Night Live co-star) and half of the original cast of All That.

In 2015, Mitchell and Thompson reunited on The Tonight Show Starring Jimmy Fallon where they performed a special Good Burger sketch. Dan Schneider returned to write the sketch for the show.

In 2015, Comikaze Expo held the second All That reunion. Angelique Bates, Chelsea Brummet, Ryan Coleman, Lori Beth Denberg, Jack DeSena, Lisa Foiles, Bryan Hearne, Katrina Johnson, Christina Kirkman, Christy Knowings, Kel Mitchell, Alisa Reyes, Giovonnie Samuels, Mark Saul, Josh Server, and Danny Tamberelli all participated in the event.

On April 22, 2016, Nickelodeon aired a reunion special consisting of new 3–4 minute shorts with most of the original cast, including Kenan and Kel.

In 2018, Lori Beth Denberg, Kel Mitchell, Josh Server, and Kenan Thompson appeared together on an episode of Nick Cannon's MTV series Wild 'n Out.

Spin-offs

Kenan & Kel

Kenan & Kel is an American teen comedy sitcom created by Kim Bass for Nickelodeon. It starred then-All That cast members Kenan Thompson and Kel Mitchell. Sixty-five episodes and a made-for-TV movie were produced over four seasons. The first two seasons were taped at Nickelodeon Studios in Orlando, Florida, and the remaining two were taped at the Nick on Sunset theater in Hollywood.

The Amanda Show

The Amanda Show is an American live action sketch comedy and variety show that aired on Nickelodeon from October 16, 1999, to September 21, 2002. It starred Amanda Bynes, Drake Bell, and Nancy Sullivan, along with several performing artists who came and left at different points.

The Nick Cannon Show

The premise of the semi-scripted show was that its star, Nick Cannon, a former cast member on All That, would come across a situation he thought needed changing and then "take over" to make things better, or at least funnier.

In other media

Good Burger

All That made one effort in developing a popular sketch into a feature-length film with Good Burger. Co-creator Mike Tollin said:

The movie was released into theaters on July 25, 1997, with a budget of roughly $10 million. Rotten Tomatoes gives the film a score of 32% based on reviews from 38 critics. Most praise came to Kel Mitchell and Kenan Thompson's performances. Although the film received mixed to negative reviews from critics, it received positive reviews from fans and it was a financial success.

All That: The Album
On November 26, 1996, Nickelodeon released an All That CD titled All That: The Album. It contains All That dialogues from the show, and songs sung by musical guests (i.e. Faith Evans, Coolio, Brandy, Naughty By Nature, etc.). All Thats theme opening and outro theme were released on this CD. Music from the CD is mainly inspired by the show.

All That: Fresh out the Box
On October 1, 1998, Nickelodeon released a 112-page book of All That called All That: Fresh out the Box by Steve Holland. The book contains information of the show's sketches, cast members and notable points of the show. It also contains different character information as well.

Live tour 
On June 30, 2000, Nickelodeon gave All That a promotional summer tour titled All That! Music and More Festival, which traveled all over the United States and was hosted by the cast of All That. The tour began after Season 6 and lasted until September 3, 2000. The tour mainly featured the cast members of All That and a musical guest. Many of the musical guests joined and performed during the tour. Also while the tour went on, the cast members did numerous live sketches. There was also a ticket contest the year before the festival began. On July 29, 2000, Nickelodeon broadcast the highlights and events that happened during the entire festival.

iTunes
On August 15, 2011, the iTunes Store released All That: Volume 1 with the first seven episodes from season two. On November 29, 2011, the iTunes Store released All That: Volume 2 with seven more episodes from season two. All That: Volume 3 was released in 2012 with seven episodes from season two. Just like The '90s Are All That airings, the musical guest performances are omitted and the end credits are re-done as generic white text on black. All That Volume 4, with episodes from the start of season 3, was released on iTunes August 13, 2012; however, episodes 40 and 43 are excluded for unknown reasons with episodes 45 and 46 included instead.

On June 24, 2013, the iTunes Store released All That: Retro Essentials with four episodes from season two. The episodes are 217, 220, 228, 237. Episodes 217, 220 and 228 were re-released with the musical guest performances. Episode 237 has the musical guest edited out.

Reruns/syndication
All That ran on Nickelodeon from 1994 until 2005. All That aired on Nick at Nite on Mondays to Thursdays at 8:00 pm from June 25, 2012, until July 12, 2012, alongside Kenan & Kel at 8:30 p.m. EST. The Nick at Nite airings, had the musical performances edited out. All That ran in reruns on The N (during its daytime block of TEENick shows) from March 12, 2008, to September 15, 2008.

On July 25, 2011, TeenNick debuted a block named after the show, "The '90s Are All That." All That aired as part of the block from its launch until December 27, 2012, then again from March 4, 2013, to June 1, 2014. The '90s Are All That airings, however, also have the musical guest performances edited out, along with their introduction sketches (presumably for time and the high cost of obtaining music distribution rights). It initially only aired episodes from seasons 2 and 3, later adding seasons 4 and 5 into the rotation. However, the reruns on The N in 2008 aired seasons 3 and 5 uncut and retained the musical guest performances (with the exception of the K-Ci & JoJo episode). The final rotation of these reruns included seasons 6 and 7.

Streaming
Seasons two through five and season eleven are available to stream on Paramount+. On May 24, 2022, Netflix announced that select seasons of All That, Kenan & Kel, and Ned's Declassified School Survival Guide would be available to stream starting June 21.

References

External links

 
 
 IMDB's All That 100th episode

 
1990s American satirical television series
1990s American sketch comedy television series
1990s American variety television series
1994 American television series debuts
2000s American satirical television series
2000s American sketch comedy television series
2000s American variety television series
2000 American television series endings
2002 American television series debuts
2005 American television series endings
2019 American television series debuts
2020 American television series endings
2010s American satirical television series
2010s American sketch comedy television series
2010s American variety television series
2020s American satirical television series
2020s American sketch comedy television series
2020s American variety television series
1990s Nickelodeon original programming
2000s Nickelodeon original programming
2010s Nickelodeon original programming
2020s Nickelodeon original programming
English-language television shows
Television shows filmed in Florida
Television shows filmed in California
American television series revived after cancellation
Television series about television
Television series by Schneider's Bakery
Television series by Tollin/Robbins Productions
Cross-dressing in television
Television series created by Dan Schneider
Children's sketch comedy
1990s American children's television series
2000s American children's television series
2010s American children's television series
2020s American children's television series